Ivan Dmytrovych Balan (born 1 June 1949) is a Ukrainian football coach and former player.

Career
Balan began playing football as a goalkeeper in the youth system of Sudnobudivnyk Mykolayiv. In 1972, he joined the club's senior side and eventually scored two goals while playing occasionally in the outfield. Due to the age limit utilized in the Soviet Second League, Balan retired from playing at age 31.

Balan managed his former club Sudnobudivnyk Mykolayiv, leading it to a second-place finish in the 1990 Soviet Lower Second League, Zone 1. After managing the club in the 1991 Soviet Second League, Balan led the club during the inaugural 1992 Ukrainian Premier League season (operating under the name Evis Mykolayiv) but resigned as the club were relegated to the second tier.

Balan was appointed manager of Ukrainian Premier League side Illichivets Mariupol in 2004, and managed the club until he was fired when the club dropped into last place following a loss against FC Chornomorets Odesa in the 23rd round of the 2006–07 season.

Coaching Record

References

External links

 

1949 births
Living people
Soviet footballers
Ukrainian footballers
MFC Mykolaiv players
Ukrainian football managers
Ukrainian Premier League managers
Ukrainian people of Romanian descent
MFC Mykolaiv managers
FC Krystal Kherson managers
SC Tavriya Simferopol managers
FC Mariupol managers
Soviet people of Romanian descent
Association football goalkeepers
Sportspeople from Kirovohrad Oblast